Klaus Grünberg (born 20 November 1941 in Wismar, Germany) is a German actor.

Filmography

References

External links

Sibylle Flöter Agency Munich 

1941 births
Living people
People from Wismar
People from Mecklenburg
German male television actors
German male film actors
20th-century German male actors
21st-century German male actors